Cork City is a barony in County Cork,  Ireland. It contains seven civil parishes.

Legal context
Baronies were created after the Norman invasion of Ireland as divisions of counties and were used the administration of justice and the raising of revenue. While baronies continue to be officially defined units, they have been administratively obsolete since 1898. However, they continue to be used in land registration and in specification, such as in planning permissions. In many cases, a barony corresponds to an earlier Gaelic túath which had submitted to the Crown.

Location 
The barony formed the medieval heart of the city but must be distinguished from the similar-sounding Barony of Cork which is a separate entity that surrounds the Barony of Cork City. The present city of Cork takes in both baronies. The estuary of the River Lee at its confluence with the River Glashaboy at Glanmire forms the boundary with the Barony of Barrymore. North of the Lee, a single civil parish - Rathcooney - in the Barony of Cork, separates the barony from that of Barrymore. At all other points, the Barony of Cork envelopes the Barony of Cork City.

Civil parishes 
North of the Lee:
 St. Mary's, Shandon
 St. Anne's, Shandon
South of the Lee:
 Holy Trinity
 St. Peter's
 St. Paul's
 St. Finbar's
 St. Nicholas

See also 
 List of civil parishes of County Cork
 Cork City Council

References
From :

From other sources:

Baronies of County Cork
Politics of Cork (city)